Darvish Ali (also Romanized as Darvīsh ‘Alī) is a village in Behi-e Feyzolah Beygi Rural District, in the Central District of Bukan County, West Azerbaijan Province, Iran. At the 2006 census, its population was 133, in 26 families.

References 

Populated places in Bukan County